Paul Lester Byrne (May 8, 1910 – August 28, 1962) served in the California State Senate for the 6th district from 1951 until his death in 1962. He was known as an advocate for farming in California.

Early life and education
Byrne was born on May 8, 1910 in San Diego, California. He attended University of California, Berkeley and graduated from Chico State College with a bachelor of arts in 1933. He worked as the business manager for Associated Students at Chico State College, and for nine years at the Welfare Division at McClellan Field in Sacramento. In 1943, he joined the United States Marine Corps, and served in Hawaii during World War II in a headquarters unit.

Career
The Paul L. Byrne Agricultural Teaching and Research Center and the Paul L. Byrne Memorial University Farm at California State University, Chico are named after him.

Death
On August 28, 1962, Byrne died from an acute heart attack while working in his office in Chico.

References

1910 births
1962 deaths
Republican Party California state senators
Politicians from San Diego
California State University, Chico alumni
University of California, Berkeley alumni
Agriculture in California
20th-century American politicians
United States Marine Corps personnel of World War II